Mannequins of Paris (French: Mannequins de Paris) is a 1956 French drama film directed by André Hunebelle and starring Madeleine Robinson, Ivan Desny and Mischa Auer. It is set in the world of high fashion. The film's sets were designed by the art director Lucien Carré. It was shot in Technicolor with location shooting in Paris, Cannes and Rome.

Synopsis
Promising artists Pierre gives up his career as a promising artist to help design styles for his wife Véronique's successful fashion house in Paris. Feeling neglected by her obsession with the business, he has an affair during a trip to Cannes to present the new collection and falls in love with an attractive singer.

Cast
 Madeleine Robinson as 	Véronique Lanier
 Ivan Desny as Pierre Lanier
 Mischa Auer as 	Yaschlik 
 Jacqueline Pierreux as 	Pearl
 Max Révol as 	Max
 Georges Chamarat as Boris Rabinowsky
 Jeanne Fusier-Gir as 	Gabrielle
 Marie-Hélène Arnaud as 	Josette
 Ghislaine Arsac as 	Wanda
 Jacqueline Huet as Christiane
 Elisa Lamotte as 	Une cliente 
 Fabienne as Barbara
 Véronique Verlhac as 	Micheline
 Yvonne Monlaur as 	Janine
 Yôko Tani as 	Lotus
 Georgette Anys as 	Madame Vauthier
 Agnès Laurent as 	Lucette
 Pascale Audret as 	Francette
 Jacqueline Noëlle as 	Hermine
 Paulette Arnoux as 	Véronique - la bonne
 Blanche Issartel as 	Madame Blanche
 Anna Gaylor as 	Louisette
 Madeleine Barbulée as 	Madame Madeleine - la première
 Eliane Angeneau as 	Suzanne
 Daniel Ceccaldi as Un ami de Barbara
 Gregori Chmara as Boris

References

Bibliography
 Bessy, Maurice. Histoire du cinéma français: 1956-1960. Pygmalion, 1986.

External links 
 

1956 films
1956 drama films
French drama films
1950s French-language films
Films directed by André Hunebelle
Pathé films
Films set in Paris
Films shot in Paris
Films shot in Rome
Films set in Cannes
Films with screenplays by Michel Audiard
1950s French films